Melhania rehmannii is a plant in the family Malvaceae, native to southern Africa. It is named for the Polish botanist and geographer Anton Rehmann.

Description
Inflorescences have solitary flowers. The flowers feature yellow petals.

Distribution and habitat
Melhania rehmannii is native to Botswana, Mozambique, Namibia, South Africa (Cape Provinces, Free State, Northern Provinces), Eswatini and Zimbabwe. Its habitat is dry areas including bushveld, sandy flats or rocky ridges.

References

rehmannii
Flora of Southern Africa
Flora of Mozambique
Flora of Zimbabwe